The Schleswig Party is a regional political party in Denmark representing the North Schleswig Germans.

History
The party was established in August 1920 as the Schleswig Voters Club following the Schleswig Plebiscites and the ceding of Northern Schleswig from Germany to Denmark. It ran in the September 1920 Folketing elections, winning a single seat taken by Johannes Schmidt. The party maintained its single seat in elections in 1924, 1926, 1929, 1932, 1935 and 1939.

The party did not run in the 1943 or 1945 elections, but returned to contest the 1947 elections, in which it failed to win a seat. The party remained seatless until the September 1953 elections, retaining its seat in 1957 and 1960. The 1964 elections saw the party lose its single seat, and it did not contest the 1966 elections.

The party returned to run in the 1968 elections, but failed to win a seat. After failing to win a seat in the 1971 elections, the party has not contested any further national elections, although it continues to participate in local politics in North Schleswig.

Between 1973 and 1979 the party was represented in Parliament by Jes Schmidt, a candidate elected through an electoral agreement with the Centre Democrats. After his death in 1979, the agreement between the two parties stopped because the SP proposed a candidate with a Waffen-SS past, thus unacceptable for the CD.

Leaders
Johannes Schmidt (1920–35)
Hans Christian Jepsen (1983–91)
Peter Bieling (1991–99)
Gerhard Mammen (1999–2010)
Marit Jessen Rüdiger (2010–12)
Carsten Leth Schmidt (2012–2022)
Rainer Naujeck (2022–)

Election results

Folketing

Landsting

Local elections

References

External links
Party website

German diaspora political parties
Political parties in Denmark
Political parties established in 1920
1920 establishments in Denmark
Regionalist parties
North Schleswig Germans